Space Sentinels (originally titled Young Sentinels and renamed midway through its only season) is a Saturday morning animated series produced by Filmation which debuted on the American NBC network on September 10, 1977 and ran for thirteen half-hour episodes. The science fiction action series follows a superhero team during missions to protect the Earth.

Premise 
Three young Earth people were selected many centuries ago and teleported to another planet, where they were given eternal youth and superpowers. They were trained and returned to Earth, where they are tasked with protecting the planet and its vicinity, similar to the Green Lantern Corps. Hercules and Mercury through superhuman feats became the basis for the mythological Roman deities of the same names. They are joined by Astrea, namesake of the Greek deity but with unrelated powers.

Their base of operations and living quarters is a spaceship hidden within the caldera of a dormant volcano. They are supervised by Sentinel One, a member of a series of sentient supercomputers that command and coordinate Sentinel teams, although the race that gave the Sentinels their powers is ostensibly humanoid. For missions anywhere on Earth, the team is launched through vertical tubes and fly to their destination through the use of rocket belts in their suits, which seem to have intercontinental range as well as hypersonic capability (although Mercury can fly even faster). For interplanetary and interstellar missions, Sentinel One transports them within the spacecraft, which has faster-than-light capability.

The series was set in 1985, eight years after the series' debut; in the episode "The Time Traveler", Hercules and Astrea use time belts to return to "the present" and set the belts for 1985.

Characters
Hercules: blond-haired and blue-eyed man possesses superhuman strength and is obsessed with exercise and healthy eating. He was voiced by George DiCenzo, who also voiced Sentinel One.
Mercury: Mercury can run and fly purportedly up to the speed of light. Mercury is Chinese and practices martial arts as a hobby. He is usually the jokester. Although capable of flight like the other Sentinels, he often prefers to run at super high speed on the ground. He was voiced by Evan Kim.
Astrea: Astrea can morph into any Earth animal and is the de facto field leader of the team.  She, along with Super Stretch and Micro Woman and the Super Friends' Black Vulcan, was one of the very few black superheroes in cartoons of the era. She was voiced by Dee Timberlake.
Sentinel One: Nicknamed S-1, a sentient supercomputer integrated into the spaceship who monitors all situations, alerts the team about threats and provides advice and information during missions. He communicates as a large, hairless, holographic head projected within the interior of the spacecraft. Other Sentinel computers seen in the series include Sentinel Seven (with a female aspect) and the Prime Sentinel, the supreme commander depicted as a bearded, older head.
MO (Maintenance Operator): "Moe" is a small, boxy service robot in charge of maintaining Sentinel One and the spaceship, similar in purpose to R2-D2 but speaking in colloquial American English, with an appearance somewhat similar to the maintenance drones of Silent Running. He is voiced by Filmation co-founder and executive producer Lou Scheimer. MO is infatuated with Astrea and is often the comic relief.

Episodes

Production 
The show was originally entitled The Young Sentinels, but retitled Space Sentinels after several episodes had been broadcast in order to emphasize the science fiction aspect and capitalize on the extreme popularity of the then-recently released Star Wars. However, as the entire series had already been produced and the dialogue could not be altered, the characters are sometimes addressed as "Young Sentinels," but never "Space Sentinels," within the episodes.

When casting the lead voice actors, the producers strove to match the actors' ethnicity to that of the characters. Additional, uncredited actors including Alan Oppenheimer and Ted Cassidy provided voices for guest characters.

Like many Saturday morning children's shows in the 1970s, the scripts emphasized morals including tolerance, understanding, environmental awareness, friendship and teamwork, so many of the opponents were simply misguided or misunderstood rather than actual malevolent villains.

As was the case with virtually all Filmation productions of the 1970s, the theme and background music were credited to Ray Ellis and producer Norm Prescott under their pseudonyms Yvette Blais and Jeff Michael, although Prescott's actual creative involvement is unclear.

Home media
BCI Eclipse LLC (under its Ink & Paint classic animation entertainment brand) (under license from Entertainment Rights) released all 13 episodes of Space Sentinels on DVD in Region 1 on August 22, 2006, along with all five episodes of The Freedom Force, uncut, restored and digitally remastered. This series featured the character Hercules and originally aired as part of Tarzan and the Super 7. In addition, extras include scripts and Spanish language tracks for all 13 episodes, audition tapes, a gallery featuring original images, early presentation images, trivia and interviews with creators Lou Scheimer, Buzz Dixon, Darrell McNeil, J. Michael Reaves, Robert Kline and David Wise.

References

External links
 
 
 Space Sentinels - InternationalHero.co.uk
 Space Sentinels - The Chestnut.com
 Space Sentinels - Whimsy.demon.co.uk via Internet Archive
 Space Sentinels from worst to best

1970s American animated television series
1977 American television series debuts
1978 American television series endings
American children's animated action television series
American children's animated space adventure television series
American children's animated science fiction television series
American children's animated superhero television series
Television series by Filmation
Television series set in 1985
NBC original programming
Television series by Warner Bros. Television Studios
Television shows directed by Hal Sutherland